The following are lists of Grand Slam singles finals in tennis:

 List of Grand Slam men's singles finals
 List of Grand Slam women's singles finals

Grand Slam singles finals
Singles finals